Border polls are referendums that are either about the exact location of a border or whether there should be a particular border at all.  They seen as an alternative to war and respecting the right to self determination of the local population, although sometimes there can be disputes as to their fairness and whether it is instead a legitimation of the current regime.

Border Polls held in the aftermath of the First World War

 1919 Vorarlberg referendum
 1920 Carinthian plebiscite
 1920 Schleswig plebiscites
 1919 Ålandic status referendum
 1920 East Prussian plebiscite
 1935 Saar status referendum
 Sopron plebiscite
 Upper Silesia plebiscite

Other Border Polls
 1973 Northern Ireland border poll
 1915–1916 Church of England border polls
 1961 British Cameroons referendum
 2012 North Kosovo referendum
 2015 La Manga del Cura status referendum
 Abyei status referendum

See also 
 Northern Ireland border poll (disambiguation)